Frances Marion Dee (November 26, 1909 – March 6, 2004) was an American actress. Her first film was the musical Playboy of Paris (1930). She starred in the film An American Tragedy (1931). She is also known for starring in the 1943 Val Lewton psychological horror film I Walked With a Zombie.

Early life
The younger daughter of Francis "Frank" Marion Dee and his wife, the former Henriette Putnam, Frances Marion Dee was born in Los Angeles, California, where her father worked as a civil-service examiner.

When Dee was seven years old, her family moved to Chicago, Illinois. She attended Shakespeare Grammar School and Hyde Park High School, where she went by the nickname of Frankie Dee.

After graduating from Hyde Park High in 1927, of which she was vice president of her senior class, as well as voted Belle of the Year, she spent two years at the University of Chicago, where she participated in dramatic activities, then returned to California.

Career

Following her sophomore year in 1929, she went on summer vacation with her mother and older sister to visit family in the Los Angeles area. She began working as a movie extra as a lark. Her big break came when she was still an extra; she was offered the lead opposite Maurice Chevalier in Playboy of Paris.

The audience appeal established in two films opposite Paramount stars Charles "Buddy" Rogers and Richard Arlen led to the co-starring role of Sondra Finchley, opposite Phillips Holmes and Sylvia Sidney, in Paramount Pictures's prestigious and controversial production of An American Tragedy, directed by Josef von Sternberg.

Dee's additional screen credits included June Moon, Little Women, Of Human Bondage, Becky Sharp, and Payment on Demand. She co-starred with her husband Joel McCrea in the Western Four Faces West (1948).

Personal life
Dee met actor Joel McCrea on the set of the 1933 film The Silver Cord. The couple married on October 20, 1933, after a whirlwind courtship, and remained married until McCrea's death in 1990. During their lifetime together, the McCreas lived, raised their children, and rode their horses on their ranch in what was then an unincorporated area of eastern Ventura County, California. They ultimately donated several hundred acres of their personal property to the newly formed Conejo Valley YMCA for the city of Thousand Oaks, California. Dee, like McCrea, was a Republican. Joel McCrea died on their 57th wedding anniversary. 

Dee was honored at the 1998 Memphis Film Festival in Tennessee. In 2004, Frances Dee McCrea died in Norwalk, Connecticut due to complications from a stroke at the age of 94.

Filmography

References

External links

francesdeemccrea.com
Frances Dee Biography and obituary
Photographs of Frances Dee

1909 births
2004 deaths
20th-century American actresses
21st-century American actresses
Actors from Norwalk, Connecticut
American film actresses
University of Chicago alumni
Actresses from Chicago
Actresses from Los Angeles
California Republicans
WAMPAS Baby Stars